Yul Oeltze (born 13 September 1993) is a German sprint canoeist. He participated at the 2018 ICF Canoe Sprint World Championships.

References

1993 births
German male canoeists
Living people
ICF Canoe Sprint World Championships medalists in Canadian
Sportspeople from Magdeburg
European Games competitors for Germany
Canoeists at the 2019 European Games